Aldo Rodrigues de Sousa or simply Aldo (born 11 February 1988 in Brasília), is a Brazilian right back. He currently plays for Grêmio reserves team.

Made his professional debut in the Campeonato Brasileiro for Cruzeiro against São Caetano in a 3–0 home win on 26 August 2006. Aldo debut

Contract
Cabofriense (Loan) 5 December 2007 to 31 December 2008
Cruzeiro 16 November 2006 to 15 November 2009

References

External links 

 sambafoot
 CBF
 americamineiro
 cruzeiro.globo.com

1988 births
Living people
Brazilian footballers
Cruzeiro Esporte Clube players
ADO Den Haag players
América Futebol Clube (MG) players
Associação Desportiva Cabofriense players
Association football defenders
Footballers from Brasília